Bolnisi (Bolnisis munitsip’alit’et’i) is a municipality in Georgia's southern region of Kvemo Kartli, covering an area of . As of 2021 it had a population of 56,036 people. The city of Bolnisi is its administrative centre.

Geographical location 
Bolnisi Municipality is situated in the south of the country and shares a border with Armenia.

Administrative divisions
Bolnisi municipality is administratively divided into 14 communities (თემი, temi) with 46 villages (სოფელი, sopeli), two urban-type settlements (დაბა, daba) and one city (ქალაკი, kalaki).

 city: Bolnisi;
 daba: Kazreti and Tamarisi.
 the largest village is Talaveri.

Population 
The population of Bolnisi was 56,036 at the beginning of 2021, which is an increase of nearly 5% since the last census of 2014. In 2014 the ethnic composition was 63.4% Azerbaijani, 30.9% Georgian and 5.0% Armenian. The population density is 69.7 people per square kilometer (2021).

Politics

Bolnisi Municipal Assembly (Georgian: ბოლნისის საკრებულო) is the representative body in Bolnisi Municipality, consisting of 36 members which are elected every four years. The last election was held in October 2021. David Sherazadishvili of Georgian Dream was reelected as mayor.

See also 
 List of municipalities in Georgia (country)

External links 

 Website Municipality

References 

Municipalities of Kvemo Kartli
Bolnisi